The  is a multi-member constituency that represents Miyagi Prefecture in the House of Councillors in the Diet of Japan. It currently has two Councillors in the 242-member house, but this representation will decrease to two at the next election, to be held by July 2019.

Outline
The constituency represents the entire population of Miyagi Prefecture including the urban centre of Sendai. From the first House of Councillors election in 1947 until the 1992 election, Miyagi elected two Councillors to six-year terms, one at alternating elections held every three years. Under 1994 electoral reform Miyagi's representation was increased to four (two sets of two) from the 1995 election.

The district had 1,907,518 registered voters as of September 2015, the second-lowest of the 10 prefectures that were represented by four Councillors at that time. By comparison, the Hokkaido, Hyogo at-large district and Fukuoka districts each had more than 4 million voters but were limited to the same number of Councillors as Miyagi. To address this malapportionment in representation, a 2015 revision of the Public Officers Election Law decreased the representation of Miyagi, Niigata and Nagano districts to two Councillors while increasing Hyogo, Hokkaido and Fukuoka districts to six Councillors; this change began to take effect at the 2016 election, at which time Miyagi elected only one Councillor, and was completed at the 2019 election when again, MIyagi only elected one Councillor=.

The Councillors currently representing Miyagi are:
 Noriko Ishigaki (Constitutional Democratic Party of Japan (CDP), first term; term ends in 2025)
 Mitsuru Sakurai (Liberal Democratic Party, fifth term; term ends in 2028)

Elected Councillors

Election Results

Elections in the 2020s

Elections in the 2010s

Elections in the 2000s

Elections in the 1990s

Elections in the 1980s

Elections in the 1970s

Elections in the 1960s

Elections in the 1950s

Elections in the 1940s

See also
List of districts of the House of Councillors of Japan

References 

Districts of the House of Councillors (Japan)